There are two species of lizard named Garman's galliwasp:

 Celestus crusculus
 Celestus molesworthi